The Daniel Webster Wallace Unit is a state prison for men located in Colorado City, Mitchell County, Texas, owned and operated by the Texas Department of Criminal Justice.  This facility was opened in May 1994, and holds a maximum of 1428 male prisoners, held at security levels G1, G2 and G4.  

The facility is adjacent to the state's Dick Ware Transfer Facility.

References

Prisons in Texas
Buildings and structures in Mitchell County, Texas
1994 establishments in Texas